This article shows all participating team squads at the 2007 Boys' Youth European Volleyball Championship, held in Austria from 11–16 April 2007.

The following is the Austria roster in the 2007 Boys' Youth European Volleyball Championship.

Head coach:

The following is the Belgium roster in the 2007 Boys' Youth European Volleyball Championship.

Head coach: Julien Van De Vyver

The following is the Estonia roster in the 2007 Boys' Youth European Volleyball Championship.

Head coach: Raul Reiter

The following is the France roster in the 2007 Boys' Youth European Volleyball Championship.

Head coach:

The following is the Germany roster in the 2007 Boys' Youth European Volleyball Championship.

Head coach: Stewart Bernard

The following is the Italy roster in the 2007 Boys' Youth European Volleyball Championship.

Head coach: Mario Barbiero

The following is the Latvia roster in the 2007 Boys' Youth European Volleyball Championship.

Head coach: Boriss Colokjans

The following is the Nederlands roster in the 2007 Boys' Youth European Volleyball Championship.

Head coach: Peter Van Den Berg

The following is the Poland roster in the 2007 Boys' Youth European Volleyball Championship.

Head coach: Karol Janaszewski

The following is the Russia roster in the 2007 Boys' Youth European Volleyball Championship.

Head coach: Andrey Voronkov

The following is the Serbia roster in the 2007 Boys' Youth European Volleyball Championship.

Head coach: Ljubomir Galogaza

The following is the Turkey roster in the 2007 Boys' Youth European Volleyball Championship.

Head coach: Ali Kazim Hidayetoglu

References

External links
 Official website 

European Boys' Youth Championship
Boys' Youth European Volleyball Championship